Austrolycopodium erectum is a species in the club moss family Lycopodiaceae. The genus Austrolycopodium is accepted in the Pteridophyte Phylogeny Group classification of 2016 (PPG I), but not in other classifications which submerge the genus in Lycopodium. The species is native to Bolivia, Chile and Argentina.

References

Lycopodiaceae
Flora of Argentina
Flora of Bolivia
Flora of Chile
Plants described in 1865